Günter Sawitzki (22 November 1932 – 14 December 2020) was a German football player.

Career
Sawitzki's performances for underdog side SV Sodingen in the then best German division caught the attention of West German coach Sepp Herberger and made Sawitzki a proposed rival to Heinz Kwiatkowski and Fritz Herkenrath for the role as Toni Turek's successor in the West German goal. Before Sawitzki left tiny Sodingen, who had finished third in Germany in 1955, to join VfB Stuttgart in 1956, he had already played in two games for West Germany. Sawitzki's biggest success as a player was winning the West German Cup in 1958 with Stuttgart.

Sticking with Bundesliga side VfB Stuttgart for the rest of his career, the goalkeeper was in the squads of West Germany at the 1958 FIFA World Cup and 1962 FIFA World Cup, although he remained reserve on both occasions. Until 1963 he won ten caps.

Honours
 1958 FIFA World Cup fourth place

References

External links
 
 
 
 

1932 births
2020 deaths
German footballers
Germany international footballers
Germany B international footballers
VfB Stuttgart players
VfB Stuttgart II players
Bundesliga players
1958 FIFA World Cup players
1962 FIFA World Cup players
Association football goalkeepers
People from Herne, North Rhine-Westphalia
Sportspeople from Arnsberg (region)
Footballers from North Rhine-Westphalia